Vernon Fisher (born 1943) is an artist born in Fort Worth, Texas.  He earned a BA in English literature from Hardin–Simmons University in 1967 and an MFA from the University of Illinois at Urbana–Champaign in 1969.  He taught at Austin College and later at University of North Texas.

The artist is best known for his paintings that resemble chalk on a school blackboard, often with incongruous elements added.  Fish, in the collection of the Honolulu Museum of Art, is an example these "blackboard paintings".

The Art Institute of Chicago, the Hirshhorn Museum and Sculpture Garden (Washington, D.C.), the Honolulu Museum of Art, the Modern Art Museum of Fort Worth, the Museum of Contemporary Art, Chicago, the Museum of Fine Arts, Houston, the Phoenix Art Museum, the San Francisco Museum of Modern Art and the Solomon R. Guggenheim Museum (New York City) are among the public collections holding work by Fisher.

References
 Fisher, Vernon, Vernon Fisher (M. Georgia Hegarty Dunkerley Contemporary Art Series), University of Texas Press, 2010 
 Goldwater, Marge, Past/imperfect: Eric Fischl, Vernon Fisher, Laurie Simmons, Walker Art Center, 1987 
 Gumpert, Lynn and Allan Schwartzman, Investigations: Probe, Structure, Analysis; Agnes Denes, Lauren Ewing, Vernon Fisher, Stephen Prina, David Reed, The New Museum, New York, 1980
 Haring, Keith, Vernon Fisher, Rotterdam Arts Council, 1982
 Hickey, Dave, Vernon Fisher, La Jolla Museum of Contemporary Art, 1989 ASIN: B01FKT4ZHY
 Mayo, Marti and Vernon Fisher, Vernon Fisher: Story Paintings and Drawings, Contemporary Arts Museum, Houston, TX, 1980

Footnotes

1943 births
Living people
American artists
University of Illinois Urbana-Champaign alumni
People from Fort Worth, Texas